The Pittsburgh Renaissance Festival is a Renaissance fair located in West Newton, Pennsylvania. The fair will enter season  next year. In 2005 the fair had 55,000 attendees.

The setting for the fair is a village called Morelandshire, sometime between 1533 and 1536.

History 
The fair was founded in 1994, and held for three seasons at the Butler County Fairgrounds, while the organizers searched for a suitable property.  The present site, an abandoned farm which had subsequently been strip mined and landscaped, was selected for its ideal location and setting, and first hosted the fair in the summer of 1997. In 2006 the fair was canceled due to lack of financing. However, a year later, the fair was purchased by Rocky Mountain Festivals and was reopened under the direction of the company's CEO.

With the 2020 season cancelled because of the COVID-19 pandemic, the 27th was deferred to 2021.

See also 
 Renaissance fair
 List of Renaissance fairs

References

External links 

Renaissance fairs
Recurring events established in 1994
1994 establishments in Pennsylvania
Tourist attractions in Butler County, Pennsylvania